Hurricane Opal was a large and powerful Category 4 hurricane that caused severe and extensive damage along the northern Gulf Coast of the United States in October 1995. The fifteenth named storm, ninth hurricane and strongest tropical cyclone of the unusually active 1995 Atlantic hurricane season, Opal developed from the interaction of a tropical wave and a low-pressure area near the Yucatán Peninsula on September 27 as Tropical Depression Seventeen. The depression crossed the Yucatán Peninsula and intensified into a tropical storm on September 30. Opal intensified into a hurricane on October 2 after entering the Gulf of Mexico. The cyclone turned northeastward and strengthened significantly. By October 4, Opal was an intense , Category 4 hurricane. With a minimum pressure of 916 mbar (hPa), Hurricane Opal was the most intense category 4 Atlantic hurricane on record. However, the cyclone abruptly weakened to a low-end Category 3 hurricane prior to making landfall on the Florida Panhandle near Pensacola later that day. The storm quickly unraveled as it moved inland and became extratropical on October 5. The remnants of Opal moved northward and dissipated over Ontario the following day.

The precursor and initial stages of Opal brought heavy rainfall and flooding to Guatemala and Mexico. In the former, flooding and landslides left about 34,000 people homeless and damage to infrastructure and agriculture. A total of 31 deaths occurred in Guatemala. In Mexico, a number of rivers overflowed in the states of Campeche and Tabasco, forcing more than 42,000 people to evacuate. The storm left hundreds of millions of dollars in damage to agriculture in Campeche alone. Nineteen people were killed in the country. In Florida, high winds and storm surge left extensive damage in the panhandle. The majority of structures were swept away or experienced some degree of damage, particularly from Wakulla County westward. In Escambia, Okaloosa, Santa Rosa and Bay County, FL counties, nearly 300 homes were destroyed and 1,000 others suffered major damage. The storm left at least $2.1 billion in damage in Florida alone. Several other states were impacted by the storm, especially Alabama, where the storm spawned many tornadoes and strong winds downed numerous trees and left about 2.6 million people without electricity. A total of 27 deaths were attributed to Opal in the United States. The hurricane overall left about $4.7 billion in damage, much of which took place in the US. Due to its destructive effects, the name Opal was retired in the spring of 1996 and replaced with Olga for the 2001 season.

Meteorological history

The origins of Hurricane Opal were linked using satellite imagery and synoptic analyses to a tropical wave that left the western coast of Africa on September 11. Ten days later, the disturbance reached the Lesser Antilles after crossing the tropical Atlantic. Continuing westward, the disturbance showed little signs of organization before entering the western Caribbean Sea on September 23. There, the wave became entangled with a broad area of low-pressure east of Nicaragua, and the combined system drifted west-northwestward toward the Yucatán Peninsula; but even then, the disturbance lacked significant development. However, a burst of thunderstorm activity occurred near the storm's center on September 27, prompting the National Hurricane Center (NHC) to declare the system a tropical depression at 18:00 UTC that day.

The primordial depression meandered across the Yucatán Peninsula during the three days following tropical cyclogenesis due to the lack of dominant steering currents. Despite remaining over land for an extended period, the depression developed organized rainbands, and ships in the region reported weather conditions that were suggestive of a stronger system. As a result, the NHC upgraded the disturbance to tropical storm intensity at 12:00 UTC on September 30 while the storm was over the north-central coast of Yucatán; this classification resulted in the tropical cyclone being named Opal, which also made it the first Atlantic storm to be given a name starting with the letter O. Over the next two days, Opal entered the Gulf of Mexico before tracking slowly west-southwestward into the Bay of Campeche. There, the storm strengthened into a hurricane at 12:00 UTC on October 2. Shortly afterward, a primitive eye began to form. At the same time, a strong trough tracking across the United States caused Opal to slowly turn northeastward.

After clearing the Bay of Campeche, Opal accelerated towards the United States Gulf Coast. The combination of warm sea surface temperatures associated with an unusually warm pocket of ocean waters and an upper-level high pressure area over the Gulf of Mexico resulted in a highly conducive environment for intensification. After a significant reorganization in Opal's internal structure, the hurricane was able to rapidly intensify in these favorable conditions. The tropical cyclone's eye measured  at peak intensity as the storm was beginning an eyewall replacement cycle. The progression of this cycle resulted in Opal's gradual weakening thereafter. Weakening quickened as Opal moved further inland, degenerating into a tropical depression over Tennessee less than a day after landfall. The diffusing cyclone transitioned into an extratropical cyclone shortly afterwards; these extratropical remnants tracked towards the northeast before they were last noted along the northern shore of Lake Ontario in Eastern Ontario.

Preparations

Although Opal was a weak system located over the Yucatán Peninsula at the time, 350 people evacuated from Grand Isle, Louisiana on September 28 after rough surf associated with the distant cyclone began to threaten Louisiana Highway 1—the only thoroughfare connecting Grand Isle with the Louisianan mainland. The following day, oil companies operating offshore oil drilling platforms in the Gulf of Mexico began evacuating workers from the rigs to land. On October 1, a coastal flood watch was issued for portions of the United States Coast due to the risk of storm surge from Opal. The United States Coast Guard issued an advisory for boaters in the Gulf of Mexico to use caution or remain in port where possible. The next day, the Galveston, Texas, emergency operations center opened to monitor the tropical cyclone and deliberate upon potential preparations for the city. Meanwhile, the launch Space Shuttle Columbia's STS-73 mission set for October 5 was postponed due to Opal's anticipated effects.

On October 3, a voluntary evacuation order was placed on Plaquemines Parish, Louisiana, due to the risks of potential storm surge. Schools were also closed by noon that day across the parish. Voluntary evacuation orders for the Florida panhandle, which would ultimately be the most heavily affected area, also began the same day with several counties giving evacuation orders. Farther west, a mandatory evacuation order was placed on Mobile County, Alabama, by then-Governor Fob James. Just before noon on October 4, with the hurricane near landfall, Escambia, Okaloosa and Santa Rosa counties halted evacuations, instead ordering those still within vulnerable areas to seek shelter instead. However, the large number of evacuees led to severe traffic congestion; Escambia County officials estimated that "tens of thousands" were still on evacuation routes within the county only a few hours before Opal made landfall. Mass evacuations in some other counties concluded during the afternoon of October 4, though many evacuees in other locations were unable to reach safe areas prior to the onset of gale-force winds.

An estimated 100,000 people evacuated from the United States Gulf Coast ahead of Opal, with 5 percent of evacuees seeking public shelters and over half of evacuees seeking shelter out of their home counties; in their post-storm assessment the Federal Emergency Management Agency (FEMA) noted that the landfalls of Hurricane Allison and Hurricane Erin on the Florida panhandle earlier in the year produced a dichotomous mood toward preparations for Hurricane Opal—some people may have taken a "wait and see" approach that resulted in complacency, while others affected by the widespread power outages caused by Erin may have acquired a greater sense of readiness toward the approaching hurricane. Regardless, the overall evacuation process was described as chaotic, and the failure to clear hurricane evacuation routes of casual or communal traffic was blamed for the relative unease during evacuations for Opal. Traffic congestion on these routes caused some evacuees to return to vulnerable areas along the coast while raising fears that stranded evacuees on highways could be subjected to potentially fatal hurricane-force winds.

The post-landfall watches and warnings released in accordance with Opal were a flash flood warning released on October 5 for portions of Alabama, northern Georgia, and the western parts of North Carolina and South Carolina. The warning also included eastern Tennessee. A flash flood watch was also in effect for portions of the Upper Ohio Valley, the Mid-Atlantic region, the central Appalachians, and the lower Great Lakes. Wind warnings were in effect for northwestern South Carolina all the way to western New York. A gale watch was also in effect for Lake Erie, Lake Ontario, and the southern sections of the St. Lawrence Seaway.

Six hours later, the gale warnings over Lake Erie, Lake Ontario, and the southern sections of the St. Lawrence Seaway were upgraded into a storm warning for Erie alone. The gale warning for the other two sections remained. The shoreline of Lake Erie was under a beach erosion warning from Buffalo, New York to Ripley, New York. The Storm Prediction Center released a tornado watch for northern and central New Jersey and portions of New York and Connecticut on October 6.

Significant non-surge areas of Escambia County, Florida, south of US 98 were included in evacuation areas because of the potential for isolation by flooding.

Impact

Mexico and Central America
Although Opal was only a weak tropical storm when it affected the Yucatán Peninsula, its slow movement led to prolonged, flooding rains over much of the region. Tabasco received about 20 percent of its annual rainfall in four days due to the cyclone. Across Campeche and Tabasco, more than 42,000 people were forced to evacuate as rivers overflowed their banks. According to Notimex, approximately 100,000 people evacuated due to the storm. By October 1, an estimated 500,000 acres of crops had been destroyed by the floods. Governor Jorge Salomon ordered the closure of all government offices, businesses, and schools by October 2 in light of the extensive flooding. At least 60 towns across the state were isolated by the extreme rainfall. By October 3, agricultural losses in Campeche alone were estimated in the billions of pesos (hundreds of millions of USD). At least 19 people perished across Mexico while another 31 were killed in Guatemala.

Florida
About  of Florida's coastline felt the impact of Hurricane Opal.

The highest gust recorded was a  gust at the latter.

Opal caused about US$4.7 billion (1995 dollars) in damage, making it the third costliest hurricane at the time. Most of the structural damage occurred near the coastline on the Florida Panhandle, due to intense surge. Nearly a mile of U.S. Highway 98 near Eglin Air Force Base was completely destroyed. The pavement was nearly replaced by mounds of sand left behind after storm surge. Opal also spawned an F2 tornado that killed a young woman in Florida. None died as a direct result of storm surge. This was quite unusual, considering the strength and landfall location of Opal. Okaloosa Island, Fort Walton Beach, was overwhelmed by storm surge. Numerous homes were under  of water. Residents were not allowed to return to the island until the homes could be secured. A Humvee tour was arranged by the National Guard so home owners could 'see' the damage, but the homeowners were not allowed off the bus. Where once the ocean was obscured from view by the dunes for miles, a flat open space opened up along U.S. Highway 98.

U.S. Gulf Coast 
Numerous downed trees across much of the southeastern United States left over 2 million people without power. Alabama reported that 476,000 residents were without power, which was a record at the time; however, this number was surpassed by Hurricane Ivan in 2004. Damage was heavy far inland, all the way to Montgomery, where sustained winds reached .

Highest rainfalls in Mississippi were  throughout the eastern side of the state with lower amounts going westward.  Tropical-storm-force winds were reported along the Gulf Coast during the afternoon and early evening of October 4. Wind damage was mainly limited to downed tree limbs, power lines, and signs. One minor injury was reported in Harrison County due to flying debris. Damage in Mississippi totaled up to $75 thousand.

Tropical storm force winds were reported in extreme south Lafourche Parish and Jefferson Parish, as well as extreme east St. Bernard Parish. Property damage cost estimated. Some low-lying coastal roads were flooded. Approximately 10,000 people evacuated from the southern, or lower, portions of Plaquemines, St. Bernard, Lafourche, and Jefferson Parishes. The only significant gathering of persons in public shelters occurred in Plaquemines Parish, where 1,600 people were placed in public shelters. Although no direct injuries occurred from the hurricane, an indirect injury is attributed to the hurricane in a freak accident. A Jefferson Parish employee was injured while attempting to lower a large flag on October 4. The employee, who was holding onto a rope attached a flag, was tossed high into the air, and suffered severe injuries when he fell back to the ground. Total damage in Louisiana totaled out to US$200,000 (1995 dollars).

Breaking swells from Opal in Texas caused water to spill across at the usual wash-over points which damaged several vehicles.

Southeastern United States
The peak wind gust in Georgia was a  gust in Marietta, a  gust in Columbus, and a  gust in the Atlanta-Hartsfield area. High winds in Rabun County caused $5 million (1995 USD) from the approach of Opal on October 5. The damage was worst in Rabun County where numerous trees were blown down. The wind damage was described as being worse than the March Superstorm of 1993. Power was out for some people for at least a week. More than 4000 trees were knocked down within the city of Atlanta alone. These trees fell across roads, and on power lines, homes, mobile homes, and automobiles. More than a half a dozen people were injured from falling trees in the early morning hours of October 5. There were more than 1200 telephone poles knocked down and almost 5,000 power lines snapped. Power crews from surrounding states helped to restore power to many, however, thousands of residences remained without power through the weekend.

An  gash was torn out of Interstate 285 between Roswell Road and the Glenridge Connector in Atlanta. Schools were closed on October 5 and October 6 throughout the cities of Atlanta, Marietta, and in Fulton, Coweta, Carroll and Douglas counties. A total of 47 of 101 schools were closed in Dekalb County alone. Four state parks were closed after Opal: Moccasin Creek Park, Black Rock Mountain, Vogel State Park, and Fort Mountain State Park. 273 stations reported many falling traffic lights. Agricultural experts estimated that damage to the pecan crop was about $50 million. Several rivers and creeks overflowed their banks.

Beginning the evening of October 4, numerous power outages were reported in metro Atlanta, where sustained tropical storm conditions overnight (including gusts to nearly ) felled thousands of trees. Oaks were particularly susceptible, as their root systems were loose.

Around  of rainfall was recorded in extreme northwestern South Carolina and came in reducing amounts around the rest of the state. Heavy rainfalls closed roads and bridges, causing $24 million in crop and property damage. A tornado in Chesterfield, South Carolina caused many trees to be blown down in the Carolina Sandhills National Wildlife Refuge. Trees were blown down in Orangeburg, one of those trees fell onto a car and totaled it. An F0 tornado spawned by one of Opal's bands downed a number of trees and power lines. Campers, vehicles, structures and boats were damaged in Greenville.

The Robinson Creek rains spawned flash flooding. Officials in the state had the citizens boil their water before drinking it because of a possibility that floodwater may have entered purification plants. A landslide triggered by Opal and damaged the Blue Ridge Parkway. Opal triggered a debris flow in the Poplar Cove area of Macon County. The most serious flooding apparently occurred in Avery County where evacuations were required and tanks of propane were found floating in the Banner Elk River.

Three deaths also occurred in the state. A man in Candler was killed when a falling tree destroyed his mobile home. Another man was killed near Marshall when a tree was blown onto him while he was helping cut other trees out of the roadway. 10 people were also injured by wind blown debris and from falling trees. Damage from high winds totaled up to $15 million.

Mid-Atlantic United States 
In Virginia, trees in the Shenandoah Valley and along the Allegheny Plateau were blown down by  winds at higher elevations. Over 7000 people were without power and damage in Virginia totaled to $5000. The National Park Service reported dozens of trees blown down along Skyline Drive in two counties.

In the Great Smoky Mountains, power and phone service were out in many areas of the park. Newfound Gap road closed for several days due to trees and a rockslide that were lying across it. Campers were asked to leave Elkmont Campground near Gatlinburg because of high water. Many sections of the Blue Ridge Parkway were closed because of trees that fell across the road. Flooding occurred in the northern portion of the parkway. Linville Falls was evacuated; the Asheville and Gillespie Gap Districts were closed. Rockslides and mudslides had also been reported due to Opal.

In West Virginia,  of rain were reported causing some schools to let out early. High winds associated with the remnants of Opal moved through southeast West Virginia on the 5th. Numerous trees, large branches, power lines and shingles off the roofs of homes were ripped off in the wind. The vast majority of damage occurred at elevations above two thousand feet. Damage from the wind totaled out to $2000. Large limbs were downed by high wind across from the remnants of Hurricane Opal in Preston County. Damage there totaled out to $1000. Damage in West Virginia totaled out to only $5,000.

In Maryland, a large tree and its limbs along Maryland Route 495 near Bittinger were downed by high winds associated with the remnants of Opal. The damage from the fallen tree and its limbs totaled out to one thousand dollars. Mesocyclones moving around Opal's eastern periphery within Maryland spawned three tornadoes in Charles, Prince George's, and Anne Arundel County. The first tornado tracked along State Route 425 between the towns of Ironside and Grayton. Along the tornado's path, several trees were uprooted or snapped; two sheds were destroyed and two others sustained roof damage. Windows were blown out of a barn and several vehicles. Ten thousand dollars in damage occurred. The Potomac Electric Power reported 9000 people without power. Damage from the second tornado totaled out to $5 million. The third and final tornado touched down in Odenton, became an F1 tornado and doing $250,000 in damage to the area. Eleven houses were damaged and about 10,000 people were without power in the whole district that the Baltimore Gas and Electric serves.

Central United States
Wind speeds at the higher elevations of the Appalachian Mountains were recorded at  whereas  gusts were more common at the lower elevations. Trees and power lines were down over much of the region. Over  of the Appalachian Trail were closed due to trees being down. A total of over 20,000 people were without power from Opal's wrath. The most damage occurred in Hamilton County, which had damage was estimated over a total of $1 million. Damage in Hamilton County include a circus was left stranded at a campground and needed to be evacuated. A number of residences and businesses were also surrounded by water and occupants were to be evacuated. Total damage in Tennessee totaled out at $2.02 million.

In Kentucky,  of rain was reported throughout the state from Opal. Several trees were knocked down and soils were saturated after Opal passed through. A bridge washed out over Sulphur Creek and minor flooding was reported across Kentucky Route 80. Elizabethtown and the Fort Knox area had several roads closed after Opal washed them out.

In Michigan, Opal produced  of rain over the Middle Rouge River Basin from late afternoon through the evening on the 5th. As a result, the Middle Rouge River crested one foot over flood stage, causing the Edward Hines Drive to be closed off to traffic. High winds associated with the remains of Hurricane Opal affected the area during the late afternoon and early evening on the 5th. Strong northeast winds destroyed a new 200-foot (61-m), two-story pole barn on the Marine City Highway in Marine City. The storm also cut power to several areas, resulting in some school closings. The maximum wind gust at Detroit Metro Airport was a 38-mph (61-km/h) gust, which was from the northeast. The damage from this incident totaled out to $15,000.

Several automobiles were damaged by falling trees or limbs. Crops were damaged from the strong winds. A number of farms reported fields of corn blown over and ripe apples and other fruit being stripped from trees. Flooding was localized and not significant since very dry conditions preceded the storm. Minor to moderate beach and shore erosion occurred in many areas, especially the western end of the lake. Localized flooding occurred in communities with low-lying areas along the lake. Boats were also grounded. Damage in Ohio totaled out to $205,000.

Northeastern United States

In New Jersey, thunderstorms with heavy rain, averaging around  countywide, caused flooding of small streams and roadways including United States Route 46. The heavy rain was represented as the first significant dent in the drought that had affected northern New Jersey since September 1994.

The remnants of Opal caused severe thunderstorms that uprooted trees near Belvidere. Trees and wires were down in scattered parts of the county including Route 57 near the Tri-county Firehouse. Downed wires caused power outages in Hackettstown and Mansfield Township.

Heavy rains accompanied the storm and averaged . Flooding was localized and not significant since drought conditions preceded the storm. The prolonged period of strong winds brought down trees and limbs along with some power lines. At least one automobile was damaged by a downed tree in Erie. Several farms reported fields of corn blown down and apples and other fruit being stripped from trees. The actual crop damage estimate was unknown.

The remnants of Opal passed just to the west of Buffalo, New York on October 5 and 6. Two to 3 inches (38–64 mm) of rain fell over much of the area with isolated amounts of near  over parts of the western Southern Tier. In Oneida County, the high winds downed trees and wires in New York Mills, Waterville, Sylvan Beach, North Bay, Lee Center, Rome, McConnellsville and Verona. In Saratoga County a large tree limb was downed in Saratoga Springs which damaged four cars. Total damage in New York totaled to $35,000.

A low pressure area which used to be Opal moved across western and northern New York late and into Vermont on the night of October 5 and the morning October 6. Damaging winds occurred across parts of central and northern Vermont but especially along the western slopes of the Green Mountains. Damaging winds downed trees and power lines across Essex, Orleans, Addison, Caledonia and Rutland counties. In Essex County damage occurred in Canaan and Concord. Damage was also reported in Caledonia County, in Rutland County, in Clarendon and Chittenden and in Orleans County in Derby Center. Total damage in Vermont totaled out to $135,000.

Heavy winds and rain associated with the remnants of Opal brought down trees and knocked out power in southwestern and northern New Hampshire. One person was injured in Marlborough when a large tree blew onto his moving pickup truck.

In Maine, heavy winds and rain associated with the remnants of Opal brought down trees and knocked out power in coastal areas of southern Maine. Some beach erosion occurred in Saco. Strong winds ripped away boats from their moorings in the Midcoast towns of Camden and Rockland.

Canada
Wind and gale warnings were issued in Southern Ontario and the upper St. Lawrence River in accordance with the remnants of Opal by the Canadian Hurricane Centre on October 5. The remnants also spawned a heavy rainfall warning by the Ontario and the Quebec Weather Centers for southern parts of both provinces but anticipated rain amounts would not be of the order of the ones associated with Hurricane Hazel 41 years before.
The leftover system of Opal also spawned a gale warning for Nova Scotia.

For example, Toronto received , flooding basements and streets. In Quebec,  were recorded in Montreal, only  short of the record set by Hurricane Frederic 16 years prior.

Retirement

In the spring of 1996, at the 18th session of the RA IV hurricane committee, the World Meteorological Organization retired the name Opal from its rotating name lists due to the deaths and destruction it caused in the United States, and it will never again be used in the Atlantic basin. It was replaced with Olga for the 2001 season.

See also

 Other tropical cyclones named Opal
 List of Category 4 Atlantic hurricanes
 List of Florida hurricanes
 List of Alabama hurricanes
 Hurricane Eloise (1975) – Major hurricane that struck the Florida Panhandle in September 1975.
 Hurricane Ivan (2004) – Large and intense hurricane that caused widespread and severe damage in Florida and Alabama.
 Hurricane Dennis (2005) – Early-forming Category 4 hurricane which affected nearby areas.
 Hurricane Michael (2018) – Similarly intense; the strongest tropical cyclone to make landfall on the Florida Panhandle in recorded history. 
 Hurricane Iota (2020) – Similarly intense hurricane; that affected Nicaragua in November 2020.

References

External links

 NHC Opal report

Opal
Opal 1995
Opal
Opal 1995
Opal 1995
Opal 1995
Opal 1995
Opal 1995
Opal 1995
Opal 1995
1995 natural disasters in the United States
1995 in Guatemala
1995 in Mexico
History of Atlanta
1995 in Florida
1995 in Georgia (U.S. state)
1995 in Tennessee